Sopa de fideo, also referred to as sopita de fideo, is a stock-based noodle soup that is a part of the cuisines of Spain, Mexico, and Cavite, a province in the Philippines. It has been suggested that the dish may have originated in Spain.

Etymology
The definition of the Spanish word "sopa" is "soup". However, sopas also constitute side dishes that are a part of Mexican-American cuisine.

Overview

Sopa de fideo is a stock-based noodle soup in Tex-Mex fusion cuisine. Fideo means noodle, usually used in the plural fideos to mean vermicelli. The noodles used in the soup are typically thin, and are typically broken or cut and then browned separately prior to being stewed with the other soup ingredients. Fideo noodles, a type of thin pasta, are traditionally used, vermicelli noodles are often used, and angel hair pasta is also sometimes used. Fideo noodles are sold at some Latin grocery stores. Additional soup ingredients can include vegetables such as bell pepper, onion and garlic, tomatoes, tomato sauce, chicken, chili peppers, vegetable oil, salt and pepper.

Sopa de fideo can be an affordable soup to prepare that is flavorful and provides considerable nourishment. Some people consider it to be a comfort food.

History
The sopa de fideo originates in Mexico where it is commonly consumed throughout the country. For example, residents of Cavite, Philippines, were first introduced to the soup by Mexican in the 1600s. It has been described as a comfort food of Cavite. The Handbook of Mexican American Foods published by the Intercultural Development Research Association in 1982 describes sopa de fideo as a Spanish-style vermicelli and as "vermicelli prepared in the same manner as sopa de arroz".

See also

 Macaroni soup
 Sopas
 List of Mexican dishes
 List of soups

Notes

References

Latin American cuisine
Mexican soups
Tex-Mex cuisine
Philippine soups
Culture of Cavite